Sabuni may refer to:

 Nuraddin al-Sabuni, (d. 1184), an Islamic scholar 
 Nyamko Sabuni, (born 1969), Burundian-born Swedish politician
 Seh Boni, a village in Iran also spelled Sabuni